Dale E. Morey (December 1, 1918 – May 14, 2002) was an American amateur golfer and professional basketball player. In basketball, he played in the National Basketball League for the Anderson Duffey Packers during the 1946–47 season. In golf, he won 261 tournaments and made nine holes-in-one in his career.

Basketball career
Morey played college basketball at Louisiana State University (LSU) between 1939 and 1942. Morey then took over as head coach of the team after graduating in 1942 because then-head coach Harry Rabenhorst was called into military service during World War II. He posted a 28–19 overall record in his two seasons as LSU coach. Several years later, Morey played professionally. In 1946–47 he suited up for the Anderson Duffey Packers in the National Basketball League, and in 1947–48 he played for the Louisville Colonels in the Professional Basketball League of America.

Golf career
Morey had a long amateur golf career. He turned professional for a time, but later had his amateur status reinstated. He played college golf at LSU where he was a three-time All-American and helped the LSU team to NCAA titles in 1940 and 1942. He won several top amateur events: the Southern Amateur in 1950 and 1964, the Western Amateur in 1953, the Azalea Invitational in 1960, the North and South Amateur in 1964, the Mexican Amateur in 1968, and the Mid-Atlantic Amateur in 1972. Morey finished runner-up to Gene Littler in the 1953 U.S. Amateur, held at the Oklahoma City Golf & Country Club, losing on the final hole.  Morey courageously rallied by winning the 16th and 17th holes with successive birdies to tie the match, however he found a greenside bunker at the 18th hole and blasted out 15 feet from the pin. Littler sank a 20-foot birdie putt to win.

He played on the winning Walker Cup teams in 1955 and 1965, the Americas Cup team in 1954 and 1965, and the Eisenhower Trophy team in 1964. Morey also won many state titles against both amateurs and professionals: Indiana Amateur (four times), Indiana Open (four times), North Carolina Amateur (twice), and North Carolina Open (once). His amateur career extended into senior years, winning the U.S. Senior Amateur twice, 1974 and 1978, and finishing runner-up in 1981. He also won the U.S. Senior Golf Association Championship three times, the American Seniors five times, as well as the International Seniors and the British Senior Amateur. He also held executive positions in several golf associations including the Indiana Golf Association, Carolinas Golf Association, and Southern Golf Association.

Awards and honors
Indiana High School Golf Hall of Fame  
Indiana Sports Hall of Fame  
Indiana Golf Hall of Fame (1966)
Southern Golf Association Hall of Fame (1979)
North Carolina Sports Hall of Fame (1980)
North Carolina Golf Hall of Fame (1982)
North Carolina Sportswriters Hall of Fame  
6× Golf Digest Senior Amateur of the Year (1974, 1977–1979, 1982–1983)
Golf Digest Outstanding Senior Amateur of Decade (1970s)
American Seniors Golf Association Distinguished Senior (1995)

Tournament wins

1936 Indiana Junior 
1943 All-American Amateur, Indiana Amateur
1944 Indiana Amateur
1950 Southern Amateur
1951 Indiana Amateur, Indiana Open, Greenwood Open
1953 Indiana Amateur, Indiana Open, Western Amateur, Westborough Round Robin
1957 Indiana Open
1959 Indiana Open
1960 Azalea Invitational
1964 Southern Amateur, North and South Amateur
1966 International Men's Four-Ball Championship
1967 North Carolina Open, Carolinas Amateur
1968 Mexican Amateur, North Carolina Amateur
1969 North Carolina Amateur, Carolinas Golf Association Senior
1970 International Men's Four-Ball Championship

1971 American Amateur Classic
1972 Mid-Atlantic Amateur
1974 U.S. Senior Amateur
1975 U.S. Senior Golf Association Championship, American Seniors
1976 U.S. Senior Golf Association Championship, Southern Senior
1977 U.S. Senior Golf Association Championship, U.S. Senior Amateur, American Seniors, International Seniors
1979 American Seniors, North and South Senior Amateur
1980 North and South Senior Amateur
1981 American Seniors
1982 American Seniors, Carolinas PGA Senior, Wild Dunes Seniors
1983 American Seniors, Wild Dunes Seniors
1984 Carolinas Senior
1985 British Senior Amateur

U.S. national team appearances
Americas Cup: 1954 (winners), 1965
Walker Cup: 1955 (winners), 1965 (tied, cup retained)
Eisenhower Trophy: 1964

References

1918 births
2002 deaths
Amateur golfers
American male golfers
American men's basketball players
Anderson Packers players
Basketball coaches from Indiana
Basketball players from Indiana
College men's basketball head coaches in the United States
Forwards (basketball)
Golfers from Indiana
LSU Tigers basketball coaches
LSU Tigers basketball players
LSU Tigers golfers
People from Martinsville, Indiana
Professional Basketball League of America players